The 1950 Western Michigan Broncos football team represented Michigan College of Education (later renamed Western Michigan University) in the Mid-American Conference (MAC) during the 1950 college football season.  In their ninth season under head coach John Gill, the Broncos compiled a 5–4 record (0–4 against MAC opponents), finished in fifth place in the MAC, and outscored their opponents, 188 to 163.  The team played its home games at Waldo Stadium in Kalamazoo, Michigan.

End Pat Clysdale and defensive end Bill Zabonick were the team captains. Zabonick also received the team's most outstanding player award.

Schedule

See also
 1950 in Michigan

References

Western Michigan
Western Michigan Broncos football seasons
Western Michigan Broncos football